The Ambassador Extraordinary and Plenipotentiary of Ukraine to Romania is the ambassador of Ukraine to Romania. The current ambassador is Teofil Bauer. He assumed the position in April 2012.

The first Ukrainian ambassador to Romania assumed his post in 1992, the same year a Ukrainian embassy opened in Bucharest.

List of representatives

Ukrainian People's Republic
 1918—1918 — Oleksandr Sevryuk
 1918—1918 — Mykola Galagan
 1918—1918 — Volodyslav Dashkevych-Horbatsky
 1919—1919 — Yuri Hasenko
 1919—1923 — Kostiantyn Matsiyevych

Ukraine
 1992—1995 — Leontiy Sandulyak
 1995—1998 — Oleksandr Chaly
 1998—2000 — Ihor Kharchenko
 2000—2003 — Anton Buteyko
 2004—2005 — Teofil Bauer
 2005—2008 — Yuri Malko
 2008—2011 — Markiyan Kulyk
 2012–present — Teofil Bauer

See also 
 Ukrainian Embassy, Bucharest
 Ambassador of Romania to Ukraine

External links 
  Embassy of Ukraine to Romania: Previous Ambassadors

Ambassadors of Ukraine to Romania
Romania
Ukraine